Districts are administrative subdivisions of the Republic of China (Taiwan)'s special municipalities of the second level and provincial cities of the third level formerly under its provinces. There are two types of district in the administrative scheme.

Ordinary districts are governed directly by the municipality/city government with district administrators appointed by the mayors to four-year terms. The mountain indigenous district is a local government body with elected district chiefs as well as district council serving four-year terms.

History
The first administrative divisions entitled "districts" were established in the 1900s when Taiwan was under Japanese rule. After the World War II, nine (9) out of eleven (11) prefectural cities established by the Japanese government were reform into provincial cities. These cities are Changhua, Chiayi, Hsinchu, Kaohsiung, Keelung, Pingtung, Taichung, Tainan and Taipei. The wards ( ku) and towns ( machi) under those cities were merged into larger districts. At the same time, the districts ( kun) under prefectures also reformed as county-controlled districts.

In August 1950, another administrative division reform was performed in Taiwan, the size of counties shrink and all townships are all directly administered by the county. County-controlled districts were all defunct in this reform. At the same time provincial cities including Changhua, Chiayi, Hsinchu, Pingtung were downgraded to county-administered cities, districts of these cities were also defunct. This makes district the type of division exclusively under the five remaining provincial cities: Kaohsiung, Keelung, Taichung, Tainan and Taipei. 

When Taipei was promoted as a special municipality by the central government in 1967, several townships surrounding the city were merged into Taipei City and were reorganized as its districts. Afterwards, through another reorganization in 1990, the 12 current districts were formed. In addition, Kaohsiung, the largest city in southern Taiwan, was promoted as a special municipality in 1979. Siaogang Township was also merged to Siaogang District.

In December 2010, the four new special municipalities were established namely Kaohsiung, New Taipei, Taichung, and Tainan. Subsequently, all the county-administered cities and townships in Kaohsiung, Taichung, Tainan, and Taipei Counties were reformed as districts of the new Kaohsiung, Taichung, Tainan and New Taipei cities respectively. Their names, nevertheless, remained the same. The same thing happened to Taoyuan on 25 December 2014 where there are additional new 13 districts from the former county.

These municipalities and provincial cities use district administrative centers for public affairs services to serve the residents of these districts. Also, the directors of these districts and administrative centers are appointed by the mayors, with four years per term.

On 4 February 2014, six districts were reclassified as Special Municipal Mountain Indigenous District (or shortened as Mountain Indigenous District): Wulai in New Taipei, Fuxing in Taoyuan, Heping in Taichung, along with Namasia, Maolin, and Taoyuan in Kaohsiung.

Districts in Taiwan

Districts by cities
In the Republic of China, districts are the only subdivisions of special municipalities and provincial cities in Taiwan Province. Currently, there are 164 districts and 6 mountain indigenous districts located in the special municipalities and the provincial cities.

List of Districts in Taiwan
Colors indicate the common language status of Hakka and Formosan languages within each division.

Former districts

District changes between 1945 and 1950

District reforms in Taipei

See also
 Administrative divisions of Taiwan
 List of administrative divisions of Taiwan
 Wards of Japan

Notes

References